Glenview is an incorporated village located in Cook County, Illinois, United States, approximately 15 miles northwest of the Chicago Loop. Per the 2020 census, the population was 48,705. The current Village President is Michael Jenny.

Geography
Glenview is located at  (42.079391, -87.815622).

Glenview Creek drains the southeastern corner of the village, emptying into the Middle Fork of the North Branch of the Chicago River north of Old Orchard Road and just west of Harms Road.

Addresses in the Glenview city limits have their own numbering system. However, a small portion of Glenview, mostly at the northwestern corner of Milwaukee Avenue and Greenwood Road, have postal addresses that follow the Chicago numbering system, while unincorporated areas that have Glenview postal addresses don’t use either Glenview's or Chicago's numbering system.

Demographics
As of the 2020 census there were 48,705 people, 18,058 households, and 12,862 families residing in the village. The racial makeup of the village was 72.32% White, 1.11% African American, 0.32% Native American, 16.59% Asian, 0.04% Pacific Islander, 2.98% from other races, and 6.65% from two or more races. Hispanic or Latino of any race were 7.38% of the population.

There were 18,058 households, out of which 59.83% had children under the age of 18 living with them, 61.11% were married couples living together, 7.48% had a female householder with no husband present, and 28.77% were non-families. 26.94% of all households were made up of individuals, and 17.11% had someone living alone who was 65 years of age or older. The average household size was 3.14 and the average family size was 2.57.

The village's age distribution consisted of 24.5% under the age of 18, 5.3% from 18 to 24, 18.3% from 25 to 44, 28.7% from 45 to 64, and 23.1% who were 65 years of age or older. The median age was 46.2 years. For every 100 females, there were 94.8 males. For every 100 females age 18 and over, there were 88.0 males.

The median income for a household in the village was $118,019, and the median income for a family was $148,277. Males had a median income of $85,854 versus $54,917 for females. The per capita income for the village was $66,098. About 3.1% of families and 4.8% of the population were below the poverty line, including 5.8% of those under age 18 and 3.1% of those age 65 or over.

Note: the US Census treats Hispanic/Latino as an ethnic category. This table excludes Latinos from the racial categories and assigns them to a separate category. Hispanics/Latinos can be of any race.

History

The entire Northfield Township originally was known as the town of Northfield. There were different names for various areas within the community. The Post Office demanded that an official name be selected, whereupon a special meeting of the villagers was called. Various names were suggested such as Rugenville, Glenvarr, Glendale, Glengrove, Glen Hollow, Oak View, and Glenview. The name Glenview won the majority vote on May 7, 1895. The village was incorporated in 1899. Much of the Glenview area remained farmland but after World War II, developers such as Tom Sullivan began to give the township its current suburban appearance.

The Park
"The Park" is one of the oldest neighborhoods in the village. Located near the center of Glenview, just south of the Glen development, The Park was established as home to a religious society in 1894 by Hugh Burnham, the first village president and nephew of architect Daniel Burnham. This religious society is based on the writings of Emanuel Swedenborg a scientist and theologian who lived and wrote in the 1700s.  In the late 1890s through the turn of the century, New Church members purchased 40 acres of land and built their houses in an oval surrounding a common park area where the church and school were built. Architect Swain Nelson, one of the designers of Lincoln Park, designed the neighborhood.

As part of the New Church service mission to be universally accepted as a guidepost for kindness and character, today, the Glenview New Church Schools are open to many students beyond the congregation and the church has been updated and expanded to accommodate a much larger Sunday service.  Despite its new open focus and broadening congregation, the original church in the center and many of the surrounding buildings remain the same today as they were in 1900.

Naval Air Station

Naval Air Station Glenview was a major facility in Glenview for many years. It was host to a number of squadrons, including the Coast Guard air/sea rescue helicopter service for Chicago/Lake Michigan and a squadron of P-3 Orions which had the mission of East Coast antisubmarine warfare. The rationale for basing the squadron there was that so many reserve staff were in the central United States, and it was convenient to base the facility near the staff. As a 1−2 hour checklist had to be executed before scanning the seas, there was actually little dead time in the flight to the coast. The base consisted of 1 million cubic yards (800,000 m3) of concrete,  of runways and 108 U.S. Navy buildings. The only two buildings that are left from the naval airstation are the pilot tower and the chapel. The rest has been renovated into "The Glen Town Center" which is a shopping center.

The Glen
In 1995, the base was closed as part of the Base Realignment and Closure military restructuring process. The land was deeded back to Glenview by the U.S. Department of Defense. A reuse plan was completed by the Village of Glenview in 1995 and updated into a master plan by Skidmore, Owings & Merrill in 1998.  The village then assumed the role of Master Developer.  The  development was named "The Glen" in 1999. It comprises approximately 15% of the area of Glenview. It contains new homes, offices, and shopping centers, including a movie theater and The Glen Town Center. Among other amenities, it includes a lake, soccer fields, tennis courts, walking and biking trails, two golf courses, Kohl Children's Museum, the Glenview Park District Park Center, Attea Middle School, and the North Glenview Metra station.

Commerce
A number of major U.S. corporations have major facilities or offices in Glenview, including Illinois Tool Works, Reedy Industries, Scott Foresman, and Republic Tobacco. Kraft Heinz conducts research and development at its Glenview innovation center. Family Video had its headquarters in Glenview. There are also several large non-profit organizations in Glenview, including the headquarters of the American College of Chest Physicians CHEST Foundation as well as the United Methodist Church's General Board of Pension and Health Benefits and Wespath Benefits and Investments agencies.

Largest employers
According to Glenview's 2021 Comprehensive Annual Financial Report, the top employers in the city are:

Parks and recreation
The Glenview Park District operates the parks and park facilities in Glenview.  The Glenview Park District operates two outdoor pools (Flick Park and Roosevelt Park), the Glenview Ice Center, two golf courses (Glenview National 9 Golf Club and Glenview Park Golf Club), the Glenview Tennis Club, Wagner Farm (see below), the Grove National Historic Landmark (see below), the Kent Fuller Air Station Prairie & Evelyn Pease Tyner Interpretive Center, the Park Center (see below), Scram Memorial Chapel, outdoor skating and sledding, and numerous parks. There are also a variety of public parks that anyone can use. Parks such as Swenson Park, Cunliff Park, Little Bear Park, and many others.

On July 4, 1985, the annual fireworks display at the Glenview Park Golf Course erupted on the ground after a misfire, injuring 6 people.

Park Center
The Park Center is a prairie-style multi-purpose community center, one of the largest in Illinois, and is located in the heart of The Glen on the shores of Lake Glenview. The Park Center has an indoor pool (Splash Landings Indoor Aquatic Complex), Park Center Health & Fitness, Park Center Preschool, Glenview Senior Center, along with many programs including arts, dance, and adult and youth sports programs.

The Grove

The Grove is an area of prairie that contains an interpretive center,  historic buildings, and nature trails. The Grove houses many animals for visitors to interact with, such as snakes, snapping turtles, and skunks. Covering , the land was formerly the home of Dr. John Kennicott, who settled in the area in 1836 from New Orleans, the Kenniott family lived in a log cabin until the Kennicott House was built in 1856. John Kennicott was influential in the advancement of horticulture in Illinois. His son, Robert Kennicott, became interested in natural history, his research contributed to the American purchase of Alaska, and he was one of the founders of the Chicago Academy of Sciences. Robert's brothers Flint and Amasa started the Kennicott Brothers floral distribution company in 1886, which is still in business today. Members of the Kennicott family lived in The Grove until 1966. The Grove was designated a National Historic Landmark by the United States Department of the Interior in 1976 and is listed on the National Register of Historic Places.

Wagner Farm
Wagner Farm is an  farm owned by the Glenview Park District. Wagner Farm is the last remnant of a much larger farm which was owned and farmed by members of the Wagner family since their arrival in this area from Trier, Germany in the 1850s.  In 1997, Rose Wagner, the last surviving member of the Glenview Wagner family, died. Her will directed Glenview State Bank, the trustee for her estate, to sell the farm to the highest bidder with the proceeds to benefit her family parish, Our Lady of Perpetual Help Church in Glenview. A group of local citizens approached the park district and asked the district to buy the farm and preserve it as an historic working farm for the education and enjoyment of the community. With citizen support, a referendum to approve funds to pay for the farm was approved by the voters in 1998 and the park district purchased the farm in 2000.  In 2007, the farm had over 54,000 visitors.  Also in 2007, Wagner Farm became home to the Glenview Farmer's Market.

Johann and Katharina Wagner came to the United States from their home in Weiler, Germany in the winter of 1855. They eventually settled in Gross Point (modern day Wilmette), an area with a high population of German immigrants. Over time, the Wagners established their home on the southeast corner of Lake Ave and Wagner Road, in the heart of what is present-day Glenview. Johann and Katharina's youngest son, Thomas, married Julia Brachtendorf of the Northfield Township in 1892, and ten years later they purchased the Hoffman farm on the northwest corner of Lake Ave and Wagner Road. This is the area known as Wagner Farm today. The area was  then, but Thomas also inherited land on the northeast corner of the two roads. Thomas's siblings inherited this land in the farm's estate. Thomas and Julia had 5 children, 4 of whom remained on the farm for their entire lives. The farm was operated by Thomas' children until the last member of the family, Rose (1903–1997) died in 1997. Rose stated in her Will that the farm should be sold, and placed in trust for a local catholic church, and it remains a property of the Glenview Park District today.

Wagner Farm offers hands-on programs on the farm funded by the Glenview Park District. The programs themselves vary from season to season, but they include activities like horseback riding, tractor driving, and more activities that reflect the life of a farmer in the 1920s.

Glenview's Farmers' Market was established in 1988 by the Glenview Women of Today. After years of running it, the group realized that maintaining the market was no longer in their interest. After the group abandoned the annual event, the Glenview Park District decided to move the market to Wagner Farm. This switch was historically suitable for the farm, given that at one point, Wagner was a truck farm that produced crops in bulk for the Chicago area. A spreadsheet of the number of crops per city that Wagner provides can be found on their website. In remembrance of Wagner's truck farming history, a market wagon was constructed, and is now in display in the museum. The Farmer's Market takes place between the days of June 25 to October 8, on every Saturday. It is located across the street from Wagner Farm, giving shoppers the opportunity to visit a working 20th-century farm. In addition to the food and other products that are produced by the farm, the Market features a different musical artist to perform each week.  It is a great, family-friendly, destination.

Wildlife
Glenview is home to a rich variety of animals. These animals coexist with the human residents of Glenview and thrive in the many forest preserves that call Glenview home. The most frequently spotted birds in Glenview include robins, sparrows, cardinals, crows, Canada geese, mallard ducks, various hawks and eagles, and occasionally great horned owls.  In residential areas, squirrels, rabbits, raccoons, skunks, opossums, rats and mice cohabit with people. On nature walks through the Glen, the forest preserves, or The Grove, one can come upon white tailed deer, and an occasional coyote or fox. Also to be seen are brown rabbits, cicadas (both the 17-year and the 4-year varieties), box and alligator snapping turtles, and sometimes small frogs and toads. Among the arthropods and insects seen in Glenview are ants, bees, mosquitoes, daddy-long-legs, wolf spiders, and many others.

Forest Preserve 
Glenview's land includes portions of the Forest Preserve of Cook County, which spans across much of the Cook County of Illinois. The Forest Preserves encompass approximately 68,000 acres (275 km) of open space within the urban surroundings of Chicago. The preserves are made up of forest, prairie, wetland, streams, and lakes, which are protected as natural lands. The preserves are home to many wildlife (see above), and feature a bike path, streams and lakes (including parts of the northwest branch of the Chicago River), the Glenview Woods, and various campsite locations.

Education

Public schools

Several school districts and high school districts serve the residents of Glenview. Over half of Glenview lies within Glenview School District 34. Glenview School District 34 is the predominant K-8 district in central Glenview. Schools in this district include:
Henking Elementary School
Westbrook Elementary School
Lyon Elementary School
Hoffman Elementary School
Glen Grove Elementary School
Pleasant Ridge Elementary School
Attea Middle School
Springman Middle School

Southeast and East Glenview residents are served by Wilmette Public Schools District 39 and Avoca School District 37, Northeast Glenview is served by Northbrook/Glenview School District 30, which includes Willowbrook Elementary School and Maple Junior High; Northwest Glenview is served by West Northfield School District 31, and Southwest and South Glenview is served by East Maine School District 63. All of these districts include parts of Glenview within their boundaries. Most of Glenview is located within the Glenbrook South High School attendance area of Northfield Township High School District 225. Glenview residents who live on or east of Harms Road are served by New Trier Township High School District 203. Public high school students who reside there attend New Trier High School. The small portion of Glenview south of Central Road is served by East Maine School District 63 and Maine Township High School District 207. Public school students who reside in that area attend Washington or Melzer Elementary, Gemini Junior High and Maine East High School.

Private schools
Glenview is home to three parochial schools: Our Lady of Perpetual Help School, Open Arms Child Development Center (a ministry of Immanuel Lutheran Church), and Saint Catherine Labouré School. Our Lady of Perpetual Help School and Saint Catherine Labouré School educate pre-K and K-8 students. Open Arms Child Development Center is a school for pre-K and kindergarten students. Glenview New Church Schools, offers a Christian-based influence on its education. GNCS offers pre-K and K-8 as well as offering some part-time high school classes in the MANC (Midwestern Academy of the New Church) program. Glenview Montessori School is a fully accredited, non-sectarian school for 2-6-year-olds and is part of the Deerfield Montessori Schools, one of the first Montessori schools established in Illinois. Kensington School has a campus in Glenview, and offers pre-K and kindergarten education.

Climate
Glenview has a continental climate (Köppen climate classification Dfa), with summers generally wetter than the winters:

Religion

Glenview is home to a rather diverse religious community, including Evangelicals, Catholics, Presbyterians, Mormons, Lutherans, Methodists, Episcopalians, Congregationalists, Jews, Hindus, and Muslims. Several religious communities are as old or older than the village itself. The village is home to two Catholic parishes, St. Catherine Laboure and Our Lady of Perpetual Help Parish. In 1985, The Church of Jesus Christ of Latter-day Saints built the scenic Chicago Illinois Temple in Glenview to serve Mormons in Illinois and surrounding areas.

Notable people

 Emily Bergl, actress (Desperate Housewives); raised in Glenview
 Helen Brach, heiress to Brach Candy
 Jason Brett, writer, producer, founder Apollo Theater Chicago, producer of About Last Night, founder MashPlant
 Han Chae-young, Korean model and actress 
 Dan Chmielinski, Jazz bassist and composer
 Jack Cooley, former NBA Forward for the Sacramento Kings
 Pat Foley, broadcaster for Chicago Blackhawks; raised in Glenview, attended OLPH and Loyola Academy
 Michael Gargiulo, serial killer known as the Hollywood Ripper
 Jami Gertz, actress, grew up in Glenview
 Artis Gilmore, former Professional ABA and NBA player 
 Brian Hansen, Olympic silver medalist in speed skating; attended Glenbrook South
 Robert Kennicott, explorer and naturalist, grew up in West Northfield, now called Glenview
 Al Montoya, an NHL goaltender for the Montreal Canadiens, was raised in Glenview
 Betsy Randle, actress (Boy Meets World); raised in Glenview
 Mark Shapiro, media executive and former CEO of Six Flags
 Olivia Smoliga, swimmer who competed in the 2016 Summer Olympics; born in Glenview; attended Glenbrook South. 
 Patrick Stump, guitarist; lead singer and head songwriter of Fall Out Boy; attended Glenbrook South
 Samuel Witwer, actor ("Being Human") and musician; born in Glenview; attended Glenbrook South
 Molly Yeh, cooking television show hostess (Girl Meets Farm)

References

External links

 Village of Glenview official website
 Glenview Public Library
 Glenview Park District
 Glenview History Center
 History of Glenview

School districts
 Glenview Public School District 34
 Wilmette Public Schools District 39 (serves southeast Glenview)
 Avoca School District 37 (serves east Glenview)
 West Northfield School District 31 (serves northwest Glenview)
 Northbrook/Glenview School District 30 (serves north Glenview)
 East Maine School District 63 (serves a small part of south Glenview)
 Glenview Montessori School

 
Chicago metropolitan area
Villages in Cook County, Illinois
Villages in Illinois
1899 establishments in Illinois